Rama K. Yedavalli is an American engineering professor, currently at Ohio State University and an Elected Fellow of the American Association for the Advancement of Science, Institute of Electrical and Electronics Engineers and ASME.,

He received a Ph.D. from the School of Aeronautics and Astronautics of Purdue University in 1981 and a Bachelor’s degree was in Electrical Technology and the Master’s degree was in Aerospace Engineering, both from the Indian Institute of Science, Bangalore, India. He currently teaches at Ohio State University, in Columbus, Ohio, USA.

References

Year of birth missing (living people)
Living people
Fellows of the American Association for the Advancement of Science
21st-century American engineers
Ohio State University faculty
Fellow Members of the IEEE